Erno Matti Juhani "Emppu" Vuorinen (born 24 June 1978) is a Finnish guitarist, most famous for being a founding member and occasional songwriter of the symphonic metal band Nightwish. He is the oldest of five children, having a twin brother and three younger sisters. He started to play guitar as a private study at the age of 12 and since then has played in various bands including Nightwish, Brother Firetribe, Barilari, Almah, and Altaria.

Biography
Vuorinen had started music hobby with guitar in age of ten. Vuorinen knew Jukka Nevalainen from elementary school and met Tuomas Holopainen in gig of Nattvindens Gråt. As Holopainen started Nightwish he asked Vuorinen to join the new band. The new band called Nightwish started as acoustic music project and they asked Tarja Turunen to join initially for three songs.

Vuorinen has a black belt in judo and has won a bronze-medal from Nordic championship of the youth and two gold-medals from Finnish championship of the youth.

Vuorinen has a recording studio at Kerava with Tero Kinnunen. Vuorinen and Marko Hietala received cultural award from Kerava for their contributions.

Background
Vuorinen and Nevalainen played together in bands Ambrosia and Nidhro't before Nightwish.

Vuorinen and Holopainen founded Nightwish in 1996 with Tarja Turunen.
Vuorinen also formed Brother Firetribe as a side project in 2002 after moving to Kerava.
In 2004 Vuorinen left Altaria.

In Nightwish Vuorinen is primarily a rhythm player, often supporting the keyboard or orchestral parts of Nightwish songs. However, he plays lead melodies and solos as well. Vuorinen's solo techniques usually include alternate picking, tapping, sliding, legato, and minor to extreme whammy bar use; he also employs sweep picking, although very rarely. His solos are more melodic than those of most metal bands, but he sometimes shreds (notably in "Nightquest," "The Pharaoh Sails to Orion," "Romanticide," and "Gethsemane" by Nightwish, and also in "Traitor" by Tarot, for which he provided a solo). Nightwish's first three albums feature a larger amount of lead guitar work from Vuorinen than their later albums.

Vuorinen is also a creative force in Nightwish, having co-written songs with Tuomas Holopainen from Oceanborn until Dark Passion Play. The song "Whoever Brings The Night" on Dark Passion Play is written by Vuorinen alone.

Vuorinen has said that when he was younger there was more of need to show skills but that has diminished and since then he plays more as the song requires. Also he has left more of the songwriting responsibilities to Holopainen.

Vuorinen recorded guitar parts for Almah, a Brazilian metal band, order to help his friend and vocalist Edu Falaschi (former singer of Angra). Vuorinen did not stay in the band because of his obligations to Nightwish. He was also involved with Brother Firetribe, an AOR band, and played on four albums released worldwide: False Metal (re-released as Break Out), Heart Full of Fire, Diamond in the Firepit and Sunbound.

In 2020 Vuorinen left Brother Firetribe due to lack of time.

Discography

Nightwish
Studio albums:
 Angels Fall First (1997)
 Oceanborn (1998)
 Wishmaster (2000)
 Century Child (2002)
 Once (2004)
 Dark Passion Play (2007)
 Imaginaerum (2011)
 Endless Forms Most Beautiful (2015)
 Human. :II: Nature. (2020)

EPs:
 Over the Hills and Far Away (2001)

Brother Firetribe
Studio albums:
 False Metal (2006)
 Heart Full of Fire (2008)
 Diamond in the Firepit (2014)
 Sunbound (2017)

Altaria
Studio albums:
 Invitation (2003)

Almah
Studio albums:
 Almah (2006)

Darkwoods My Betrothed
Studio albums:
 Witch-Hunts (1998)

References

Sources

External links

Nightwish official site

Finnish heavy metal guitarists
Rhythm guitarists
Nightwish members
1978 births
Living people
People from Kitee
20th-century Finnish male singers
Finnish heavy metal bass guitarists
Finnish twins
Male bass guitarists
21st-century bass guitarists
Altaria (band) members
Almah (band) members